FPL may refer to:

Government and politics 
 Federal Poverty Level, in the United States
 Forest Products Laboratory, of the United States Forest Service
 Free Party of Luxembourg, a defunct political party in Luxembourg
 Fuerzas Populares de Liberación Farabundo Martí, a defunct Salvadoran guerrilla organization
 Liberal People's Party (Sweden), a political party in Sweden
 Popular Liberation Front (Guatemala), a defunct political party in Guatemala

Other uses 
 Federation Professional League, a defunct South African football league
 Feline panleukopenia, a viral infection affecting cats
 Filipino Premier League, a football league of the Philippines
 Film and Photo League, a defunct artist collective
 Flexor pollicis longus muscle, a muscle in the forearm and hand 
 Flight plan, documents indicating an aircraft's planned route
 Florida Power & Light, an American utility company
 Frederick and Pennsylvania Line Railroad Company, a defunct American railroad
 French Polynesia, UNDP country code
 Fullerton Public Library, in Fullerton, California, United States
 Functional programming language